Hezhou or He Prefecture was a zhou (prefecture) in imperial China centering on modern He County, Anhui, China. It existed intermittently from 555 to 1912. Between 1278 and 1291, during the Yuan dynasty, it was known as Hezhou Route.

Geography
The administrative region of Hezhou in the Tang dynasty is in modern Ma'anshan in eastern Anhui. It probably includes parts of modern: 
He County
Hanshan County

References
 

Prefectures of the Sui dynasty
Prefectures of the Tang dynasty
Prefectures of the Song dynasty
Prefectures of the Yuan dynasty
Prefectures of Yang Wu
Prefectures of Southern Tang
Prefectures of Later Zhou
Former prefectures in Anhui
Subprefectures of the Ming dynasty
Departments of the Qing dynasty